Avidia (flourished 2nd century) was a well-connected noble Roman woman. She is among the lesser known members of the ruling Nerva–Antonine dynasty of the Roman Empire.

Biography
Avidia was the daughter of the well-connected Roman Senator Gaius Avidius Nigrinus and his first wife, whose name is unknown. It is thought that Plautia was her stepmother. Avidia was born and raised in Faventia (modern Faenza, Italy). Her family was distinguished, wealthy and well-connected.

Her family were friends of the Greek historian Plutarch, Roman Senator Pliny the Younger, Roman Emperor Trajan and his family. Her family had strong links to Greece, as her paternal grandfather Gaius Avidius Nigrinus had served at an unknown date during the reign of Roman Emperor Domitian (81-96) as Proconsul of Achaea, a position in which her great uncle Titus Avidius Quietus had also served. Her family may have been related to the consul Gaius Petronius Pontius Nigrinus, who had served his consulship at the time that the Roman Emperor Tiberius had died in 37.

Avidia's father was executed in 118 on orders from the Roman Senate, because he was one of four senators involved in a failed plot to overthrow the Roman Emperor Hadrian. Sometime after her father's execution, her mother or stepmother may have married another Roman senator.

Before 130 Avidia married the powerful Roman Senator Lucius Aelius Caesar. Aelius was adopted by Roman Emperor Hadrian in 136 as his first heir. Avidia bore Aelius two sons and two daughters who were:
 Lucius Verus – born as Lucius Ceionius Commodus. He would rule as co-Roman Emperor with Marcus Aurelius from 161 until his death in 169. Lucius Verus would marry Lucilla, the second daughter of Marcus Aurelius and Faustina the Younger.
 Gaius Avidius Ceionius Commodus – he is known from an inscription found in Rome.
 Ceionia Fabia – she was 136 engaged to Marcus Aurelius. In 138, when Marcus Aurelius was adopted by Roman Emperor Antoninus Pius, Aurelius ended his engagement to Fabia. Aurelius became engaged to Antoninus Pius’ daughter Faustina the Younger, whom he later married.
 Ceionia Plautia

In early 138, Aelius died, and Hadrian had adopted Antoninus Pius as his second son and heir. Antoninus was obliged to adopt Marcus Aurelius and Lucius Verus in turn. If Aelius had lived long enough to succeed Hadrian and rule as emperor, Avidia could have been an Empress of Rome.

It is unknown whether Avidia remarried after the death of Aelius. Three existing portrait busts have been identified as Avidia because of physical similarities to the portrait busts of her son Lucius Verus. These busts have been dated to 136–138, when Aelius was the first adopted heir of Hadrian.

When her son reigned as co-Roman Emperor with Marcus Aurelius, Lucius Verus dedicated two honorific inscriptions to his mother. These inscriptions have been found in Rome. The inscriptions honor her as the daughter of Gaius Avidius Nigrinus and the mother of Roman Emperor Lucius Verus. It is unknown whether Avidia lived long enough to see her son co-rule as emperor.

Sources
Cassio Dione e l'impero romano da Nerva ad Antonino Pio: alla luce dei nuovi by Guido Migliorati, 2003 – Italian Historical Secondary Source
The Cambridge ancient history, Volume 11 By Alan K. Bowman, Peter Garnsey, Dominic Rathbone Limited preview - Edition: 2 - Item notes: v. 11 – 2000
Plutarch's Sertorius: A Historical Commentary. C. Konrad Chapel Hill: University of North Carolina Press, 1994
Marcus Aurelius, by Anthony Richard Birley, Routledge, 2000
A dictionary of the Roman Empire By Matthew Bunson – 1995
http://www.roman-emperors.org/lverus.htm
http://ancientrome.ru/art/artworken/img.htm?id=2762.
https://web.archive.org/web/20110720122702/http://ecatalogue.art.yale.edu/detail.htm?objectId=7368
http://penelope.uchicago.edu/Thayer/E/Roman/Texts/Historia_Augusta/Aelius*.html#2.8
http://penelope.uchicago.edu/Thayer/E/Roman/Texts/Historia_Augusta/Lucius_Verus*.html

External links

 Bust of Avidia

2nd-century Romans
2nd-century Roman women
Plautia
Nerva–Antonine dynasty